Clanabogan is a small village and townland in County Tyrone, Northern Ireland. In the 2001 Census it had a population of 225 people. It lies within the Omagh District Council area.

There is an anthroposophical living and working community for people with mental handicaps, called Camphill Community Clanabogan.

References

Villages in County Tyrone